Gaspard Joseph Benedict Balansa, also known as Benjamin Balansa or Benedict Balansa (25 March 1825 – 2 November 1891) was a French botanist.

Born in Narbonne in 1825, Balansa made numerous collecting trips for the Muséum national d'Histoire naturelle in Paris which holds most of his plant specimens. Others are in Muséum de Toulouse.

His first journey, from 1847 to 1848, was to Algiers and Mostaganem in Algeria.

From 1850 to 1853, Balansa returned to Algeria, collecting plants again in Mostaganem and later in Oran, Muaskar, the Northern Sahara, Biskra and Batna.

From 1854 to 1855 he undertook his first trip to Asia travelling first to Smyrna and the surrounding regions in  April and May, 1854. From March until October 1855 he lived in Mersin and the Taurus Mountains of Cilicia. The following year, he travelled from June until September 1856 from Tarsus to Kayseri in Cappadocia. In 1857 he settled with his family in Smyrna. From May until July 1857 he explored Uşak and the surrounding area and until 1865 he undertook tours to Phrygia and Cilicia. In 1866, he made a trip to Lazistan and the Caucasus, where he collected from June to August in the area of Trabzon and Rize. In autumn 1866 he returned to France.

A year later, in 1867 he collected in Morocco in the area of Mogador, the Atlas Mountains and Marrakech.

From 1868 to 1872 Balansa stayed overseas in New Caledonia and the Loyalty Islands. During this time he was Director of the Jardin d'Acclimatation in Nouméa. From 1873 to 1877, he made his first trip to Paraguay, followed by a second from 1878 to 1884. In the years from 1885 to 1889, he collected in Tonkin and undertook a trip to the island of Java. In his (1890) second stay at Balansa died in Hanoi.

See also 
  for pages named for Balansa

Notes

References
Gaston Astre, 1947. La Vie de Benjamin Balansa, botaniste explorateur. Muséum d’Histoire Naturelle, Toulouse.
Asuman Baytop, Michele Nicolas,2006. Ondokuzuncu yüzyılda Anadolu’da bir bitki toplayıcısı: Benjamin Balansa (1825–1891). In: Osmanlı Bilimi Araştırmaları. Band 8, Nummer 1, 2006, S. 105–112 (Pdf).
A. Chevalier, 1942.  L’oeuvre d’un grand botaniste colonial méconnu: Benjamin Balansa. In: Revue de Botanique appliquée et d’Agronomie tropicale. Band 22, 1942, S. 241-251.
A. Guillaumin, 1911. Histoire des explorations botaniques en Nouvelle-Calédonie et aux îles Loyalty. In: Annales du Musée colonial de Marseille. 2. Folge, Band 19, 1911, S. 291–299 (online).
Philippe Morat, 2005. Les Botanistes récolteurs en Nouvelle-Calédonie de 1774 à 2005. In: Adansonia. Band 32, Nummer 2, 2010, S. 159–216 (doi:10.5252/a2010n2a1).

19th-century French botanists
1825 births
1891 deaths
People from Narbonne